Park Won-hee (born April 27, 1981), better known by his stage name Park Hoon, is a South Korean actor. He starred in TV series such as Descendants of the Sun (2016), Naked Fireman (2017), Two Cops (2017) and Memories of the Alhambra (2018).

Filmography

Film

Television series

Web series

Awards and nominations

References

External links
Park Hoon at Story J Company

1981 births
Living people
21st-century South Korean male actors
South Korean male film actors
South Korean male television actors
South Korean male stage actors
South Korean male musical theatre actors
People from Jeongseon County